The Adventures of Ruth is a 1919 American film serial directed by George Marshall. It is now considered to be a lost film. The serial was advertised as written, produced and directed by Ruth Roland. Roland was the producer, but it was written by Gilson Willets and directed by George Marshall.

Plot
As described in a film magazine, Daniel Robin has become mixed up with a band of criminals known as "the 13," and is shot when he refuses to do their bidding. His daughter Ruth (Roland), brought home from boarding school, reaches his bedside before he expires. He tells her that she will be given thirteen keys. Instructions will be provided with each key and, if she follows the instructions, she will eventually fully learn of her birthright. Many adventures then follow as Ruth attempts to solve the puzzle of each key and establish her true birthright.

Cast
 Ruth Roland as Ruth Robin
 Herbert Heyes as Bob Wright (credited as Herbert Hayes)
 Thomas G. Lingham as LaFarge, the "Hound"
 William Human as Paul Brighton
 Charles Bennett as Wayman
 Helen Case as Countess Zirka
 Helen Deliane as Melody Morne
 Charles Belcher
 George Larkin

Episodes

 The Wrong Countess
 The Celestial Maiden
 The Bewitching Spy
 The Stolen Picture
 The Bank Robbery
 The Border Fury
 The Substitute Messenger
 The Harem Model
 The Cellar Gangsters
 The Forged Check
 The Trap
 The Vault of Terror
 Within Hollow Walls
 The Fighting Chance
 The Key To Victory

References

External links

1919 films
1910s action adventure films
1919 lost films
American silent serial films
American black-and-white films
American action adventure films
Films directed by George Marshall
Lost American films
Lost adventure films
1910s American films
Silent adventure films